Andipalayam is a panchayat village in Gobichettipalayam taluk in Erode District of Tamil Nadu state, India. Andipalayam has a population of about 2025. Andipalayam Panchayat have 8 habitations.

References

Villages in Erode district